Grahovište is a village in Vogošća municipality, near Sarajevo, Federation of Bosnia and Herzegovina, Bosnia and Herzegovina.

Demographics 
According to the 2013 census, its population was 93.

References

Populated places in Vogošća
Serb communities in the Federation of Bosnia and Herzegovina